Jeremy Cook (born 20 July 1941) is an English former first-class cricketer.

Born at Leicester, Cook played second XI cricket for Leicestershire, Surrey and Middlesex from 1959–1969, but was unable to establish himself in their starting XI's. He did make two appearances in first-class cricket for the Marylebone Cricket Club, playing against Ireland at Dublin in 1961, with a further appearance at Lord's in 1963 against Oxford University. A right-arm fast-medium bowler, Cook took a five wicket haul against Ireland, taking 5/48 in the Irish first-innings.

References

External links

1941 births
Living people
People from Leicester
English cricketers
Marylebone Cricket Club cricketers